Patrick Schikowski (born 20 June 1992) is a Polish professional footballer who plays as a left winger for SSVg Velbert.

Career 
Born and raised in Germany, Schikowski also holds German citizenship.

He is the older brother of fellow footballer Florian Schikowski.

References

External links
 
 

Living people
1992 births
Footballers from Düsseldorf
Polish footballers
German footballers
Poland youth international footballers
Association football midfielders
Fortuna Düsseldorf II players
SpVgg Greuther Fürth II players
SSVg Velbert players
Rot-Weiß Oberhausen players
FC Rot-Weiß Erfurt players
Sportfreunde Lotte players
SC Wiedenbrück 2000 players
Bonner SC players
SC Verl players
Regionalliga players
3. Liga players
German people of Polish descent
Polish expatriate footballers
Expatriate footballers in Germany